Ernst August Bertram (27 July 1884 – 3 May 1957) was a German professor of German studies at the University of Cologne, but also a poet and writer who was close to the George-Kreis and the lyricist Stefan George.

Life 
Bertram was born the son of Evangelical Lutheran Church Overseas merchant Ernst Bertram and his wife Johanne Müller in Elberfeld (today Wuppertal). Bertram then studied German history of literature, modern history of art and philosophy in Berlin, Munich and Bonn. On 9 July 1907, he received his doctorate from the University of Bonn with a dissertation written under Berthold Litzmann on Adalbert Stifter's novella technique.

The year 1906 was marked by two central encounters for him: on the one hand, he found access to Stefan George through Saladin Schmitt. On the other hand, he met his partner Ernst Glöckner at the beginning of the summer semester. Both understood their love as a "great mystery" and celebrated their Du-Tag with Beethoven's music and Thomas Mann reading. George's courtship of Glöckner led to a love triangle because Glöckner clung to Bertram.

In terms of works, various essayistic writings on Hugo von Hofmannsthal, Stefan George, Theodor Fontane, Gustave Flaubert, Conrad Ferdinand Meyer and Thomas Mann followed. Bertram was a close friend of the latter for a long time and even became godfather to his daughter Elisabeth.

In 1918, Bertram's book Nietzsche - Versuch einer Mythologie was published, with which he quickly became known in literary circles. Mann's preserved letters to Bertram (256 documents in the Deutsches Literaturarchiv Marbach) as well as Mann's Betrachtungen eines Unpolitischen (Reflections of a Nonpolitical Man), which appeared almost at the same time, bear witness to his influence on Thomas Mann during that time. The writing of these letters was accompanied by an intensive exchange of ideas. In 1919 Bertram was appointed lecturer at the University of Bonn, and in 1922 he received a professorship at the University of Cologne. In his poems in the Nornenbuch, he emphasised the inequality of peoples.

After the seizure of power by the Nazis, Bertram greeted the Nazi book burnings on 10 May 1933 with consecration verses: "Verwerft, was euch verwirrt, / Verfemt, was euch verführt! / Was reinen Willens nicht wuchs, / In die Flammen mit was euch bedroht“." (Reject what confuses you, / Condemn what seduces you! / What pure will did not grow, / Into the flames with what threatens you".) The extent to which Bertram distanced himself inwardly and outwardly from National Socialism over the next twelve years cannot be conclusively assessed.

In September 1945, an internal denazification commission at the university concluded that Bertram was "proven to be a man who belongs to the nourishers of National Socialism". In 1946, Bertram was removed from his teaching post, and in 1950, a review of the denazification process resulted in his rehabilitation and emeritus status. He was no longer active as a university lecturer.

Bertram also appeared as a poet throughout his life. Most of his volumes of poetry (including The Rhine, Strasbourg, Patenkinderbuch, Griecheneiland) were published by Insel Verlag. In addition, he wrote various so-called Spruchdichtungen, i.e. aphorisms that follow one another and stand in a certain context (Der Wanderer von Milet, Sprüche aus dem Buch Arja, Deichgrafensprüche), which in this form have a unique position in the German literature of the 20th century.

Bertram died in Cologne at the age of 72.

Honours 
 1939: Treuedienst-Ehrenzeichen in Silber, 2. Stufe
1939: 
 1943: 
1953: Wuppertaler Kunstpreis

Works 
 Zur sprachlichen Technik der Novellen Adalbert Stifters. Ruhfus, Dortmund 1907
 Gedichte. Insel, Leipzig 1913
 Nietzsche. Versuch einer Mythologie. Bondi, Berlin 1918
 Straßburg. Ein Gedichtkreis. Insel, Leipzig 1920
 Zwei Gedichte aus dem unveröffentlichten Buch der Rhein. Privatdruck (?), Weilburg 1921
 Rheingenius und Génie du Rhin. F. Cohen, Bonn 1922
 Das Nornenbuch. Leipzig, Insel 1925
 Beethovens Bild. Rede zur Beethoven-Gedächtnisfeier. Oskar Müller, Cologne 1927
 Von deutschem Schicksal, Gedichte. Insel Leipzig 1933
 Wartburg. Spruchgedichte. Leipzig, Insel 1933
 Deutsche Gestalten. Fest- und Gedenkreden. Insel, Leipzig 1934
 Griecheneiland. Insel, Leipzig 1934 
 Michaelsberg. Insel, Leipzig 1935
 Das weiße Pferd. Insel, Leipzig 1936
 Von der Freiheit des Wortes. Leipzig, Insel 1936 ( 485/1)
 Sprüche aus dem Buch Arja. Leipzig, Insel 1938
 Persische Spruchgedichte. Leipzig, Insel 1944 (Insel-Bücherei 87/3)
 Hrabanus. Aus der Michaelsberger Handschrift. Leipzig, Insel 1939
 Konradstein. Erzählung. Insel, Wiesbaden 1951
 Moselvilla. Flavus an Veranius. Bachem (commission), Cologne 1951
 Prosperos Heimkehr. Eine Gedenkmusik zur Wiederkehr von William Shakespeares Todestag . Auer, Donauwörth 1951
 Der Wanderer von Milet. Insel, Wiesbaden 1956
 Möglichkeiten. Ein Vermächtnis, edited by Hartmut Buchner. Neske, Pfullingen 1958 (mit Bibliographie Ernst Bertram S. 273–282)

References

Further reading 
 Werner Bräuninger: "Ich wollte nicht daneben stehen". Lebensentwürfe von Alfred Baeumler bis Ernst Jünger. Ares-Verlag, Graz 2006, 
 Karl Otto Conrady: Völkisch-nationale Germanistik in Köln. Eine unfestliche Erinnerung. SH-Verlag, Schernfeld 1990. 
 Erika Gerlach: Ernst Bertram. In Wuppertaler Biographien 1. Folge. Beiträge zur Geschichte und Heimatkunde des Wuppertals Band 4, Born-Verlag, Wuppertal 1958, S. 11–18.
 Peter Goßens: Ernst Bertram. In Christoph König (ed.), unter Mitarbeit von Birgit Wägenbaur among others; Internationales Germanistenlexikon 1800–1950. Vol. 1: A–G. De Gruyter, Berlin/New York 2003, .
 Hajo Jappe: Ernst Bertram. Gelehrter, Lehrer und Dichter. Bouvier, Bonn 1969
 Inge Jens (ed.): Thomas Mann an Ernst Bertram: Briefe aus den Jahren 1910-1955. Neske, Pfullingen 1960
 Norbert Oellers: Dichter und Germanist im "Dritten Reich". Ernst Bertram zum Beispiel. In Neues Rheinland. Hg. Landschaftsverband Rheinland. Jg. 39, 1996, H. 8, S. 42f.
 Friedemann Spicker: 3.5 Ernst Bertram. In ders.: Studien zum deutschen Aphorismus im 20. Jahrhundert (Studien und Texte zur Sozialgeschichte der Literatur, vol. 79). Max Niemeyer Verlag, Tübingen 2000, .
 Jan Steinhaußen: "Aristokraten aus Not" und ihre "Philosophie der zu hoch hängenden Trauben". Nietzsche-Rezeption und literarische Produktion von Homosexuellen in den ersten Jahrzehnten des 20. Jahrhunderts: Thomas Mann, Stefan George, Ernst Bertram, Hugo von Hofmannsthal among others Königshausen & Neumann, Würzburg 2001 (Epistemata; Reihe Literaturwissenschaft, 326) 

 External links 
 
 
 Baal Müller: Der Mythologe Ernst Bertram. Die Legende wirkt fort Heribert Reul über seine Begegnung mit Ernst Bertram''

20th-century German writers
German editors
Literary scholars
Germanists
Academic staff of the University of Cologne
1884 births
1957 deaths
People from Elberfeld